Imzouren (Tarifit: Imzuạn, ⵉⵎⵣⵓⴰⵏ) is a town in the north of Morocco and has an approximate population of 30,000 people. Imzouren is in the Rif mountains, near the city of Al Hoceima and now stretches almost to the village of Bni Bouayach. It is also close to the Souani Beach. Most of the inhabitants in Imzouren are Imazighen. The February 2004 Al Hoceima earthquake occurred near Imzouren and registered 6.3 on the moment magnitude scale. At least 564 people died there, with over 250 people wounded. Imzouren is annually visited by thousands of tourists, including Moroccan travellers and European tourists. There are many cafés and terraces and a lively nightlife. It is home to an SOS Children's Village.

References

Populated places in Al Hoceïma Province
Municipalities of Morocco
Rif
Berber populated places